Joel Fan (b. United States, July 29, 1969) is an American pianist and Steinway Artist "who has won praise for his technical expertise, lyrical playing, and outstanding interpretation". The New York Times has described Joel Fan as an "impressive pianist" with a "probing intellect and vivid imagination." "Fan has a flourishing international career as a performing and recording artist, notable for his fluency in the standard repertoire and contemporary works." Consistently acclaimed for his recitals and appearances with orchestras, Mr. Fan scored two consecutive Billboard Top 10 Debuts with his solo CDs World Keys and West of the Sun, while Dances for Piano and Orchestra earned a Grammy nomination.

Early life
Pianist Joel Fan was born in New York City to parents originally from Taiwan. While attending Hunter College High School he studied at the Juilliard Pre-College Division as a student of Kathryn Parker and Martin Canin. A child prodigy, he made his debut playing with the New York Philharmonic after winning the orchestra's Young People's Concert Auditions at the age of 11. He received his bachelor's degree from Harvard University, where his teachers included the composer Leon Kirchner. He holds a Master of Music degree in Piano Performance from the Peabody Conservatory of Johns Hopkins University, where he studied with Leon Fleisher. He is also a prize winner of several international competitions, including the Busoni International Piano Competition in Italy. He was also the winner of the Kosciuzko Foundation's Chopin Prize, and named a Presidential Scholar by the National Foundation for Advancement in the Arts.

Career 
Joel Fan is described as a pianist who plays with "eloquence and sensitivity", and a "rhythmic acuteness and broad tonal palette.” Fan's “commanding technique and the passion he brings to his performances” have been noted in his appearances as a concerto soloist, recitalist, and chamber musician. In addition, Fan “not only embraces classical music in his repertoire, but has commissioned new works and is also passionate about world music.”

As a concerto soloist, Joel Fan brings “vibrant, passionate, tender, sparkling life” to over 40 different concertos he has performed from the traditional classical repertoire, as well as works such as Messiaen Turangalila Symphony, Szymanowski Symphony-Concertante No. 4, and Bernstein's Age of Anxiety. He has appeared as a soloist with orchestras worldwide including the New York Philharmonic, Boston Pops Orchestra, Royal Stockholm Philharmonic, Singapore Symphony, Odessa Philharmonic, and London Sinfonietta. Among the conductors he has worked with include Keith Lockhart, David Zinman, Alan Gilbert, Zubin Mehta, David Robertson and many others.

As a recitalist, critics have reported that Joel Fan "has a huge dynamic range and tremendous facility", and his performances sound “freshly conceived and full of character”. With his “willingness to juxtapose traditional and unexpected repertory”, Fan’s solo concerts are designed to be “exciting and fun, capturing the ears of classical music lovers as well as more-casual listeners.” Fan has been presented as a solo recitalist on the stages of the Kennedy Center, the Ravinia Festival, Jordan Hall, Calgary Celebrity Series, the Metropolitan Museum of Art, and the National Gallery of Art in Washington D.C. Internationally, Fan’s recitals have been heard on four continents including his tours of China, Cuba and South America.

As chamber musician, Joel Fan has collaborated with ensembles such as the Orion Quartet, Shanghai Quartet, Imani Winds, and A Far Cry, Santa Fe Pro Musica, Northwest Sinfonietta and Columbus Pro Musica chamber orchestras. He is also recognized for his work with the cellist Yo-Yo Ma and as a member of the Silk Road Ensemble.

Silk Road Ensemble 
In 1998, cellist Yo-Yo Ma established the Silk Road Ensemble.  As a member, Joel Fan’s performances appear on their first album, Silk Road Journeys, which was released in 2001 and with the ensemble in their initial tour of China and their concerts at the Kennedy Center later that year. His history of performances with Yo-Yo Ma and the Silk Road Ensemble include concert venues such as Carnegie Hall, the Kennedy Center, the Concertgebouw, and television programs such as Good Morning America. Along with cellist Yo-Yo Ma, Wu Man on pipa, and Wu Tong on sheng, Fan also performed premieres such as Bright Sheng’s concerto The Song and Dance of Tears with the London Sinfonietta at the BBC Proms. Joel Fan is noted for his work with Yo-Yo Ma performing repertoire that includes works drawn from the traditional cello repertoire, contemporary works, the music of cultures outside the classical tradition, and in performances of traditional chamber music and Beethoven’s Triple Concerto.

Discography 
Joel Fan’s discography illustrates his highly creative musical persona. His albums have scored two consecutive Billboard Top 10 Debuts and a Grammy nomination. His music airs on radio on stations such as WQXR in New York City and WCLV in Cleveland among many others. Fan's live performances and interviews are also featured in broadcasts on radio stations including KING in Seattle, and Houston Public Media.

World Keys: Virtuosic Piano Music

Fueled by his touring around the world with Yo-Yo Ma and the Silk Road Ensemble, Joel Fan recorded his debut solo piano recital album for Reference Recordings, World Keys: Virtuoso Piano Music. Featuring ten composers from ten different countries, Fan juxtaposes virtuosic works from the Classical tradition by Prokofiev, Liszt and Schumann, with five World Premieres from composers and cultures not usually associated with piano music: Dia Succari (Syria), Halim El-Dabh (Egypt), Qigang Chen (China), Peteris Vasks (Latvia) and A. Adman Saygun (Turkey). The album debuted at No.3 on the Billboard Charts.

West of the Sun

The second solo piano album by Joel Fan, West of the Sun, contains "nine stunningly brilliant renditions drawn from a wide range of styles and sources," by nine composers from North and South America. From South America, works of Nazareth, Piazzolla and Villa-Lobos are juxtaposed with the first piano sonata of Ginastera. Two little-known works by Amy Beach and the African-American composer Margaret Bonds surround the Barber Sonata and a world premiere recording from William Bolcom from North America. The album offers fresh discoveries and classics told through Latin rhythms, European and American compositional techniques, the Negro spiritual and voices of women and further solidifies his reputation for innovative programming.

Leon Kirchner : Revelations

Joel Fan’s album, Revelations, is an homage to his mentor and teacher, the Pulitzer Prize-winning composer Leon Kirchner. An "admirable interpreter of his music", Fan's "sympathetic readings bring its emotional content to the fore" in works that piques the interest and heightens appreciation of Kirchner, the man. Fan offers an intimate portrait of the American master composer. "The album is an important recording of diverse works — piano pieces, songs, choral works, most of them little known, with music that is alluring, pungent, and intelligent."

Dances for Piano and Orchestra

The concerto album, Dances for Piano and Orchestra, reflects Joel Fan’s ongoing commitment to international music and interests that extend well beyond the standard repertoire. The wide-ranging journey focuses on the intersection of music and dance in an almost-forgotten genre - the single-movement dance piece for piano and orchestra. These virtuoso novelties, which are probably known to few musicians, offer "vitally engrossing pianism" in rarely heard compositions by Chopin, Saint-Saëns, Pierné, Weber-Liszt, Castro, Gottschalk, culminating in a world premiere recording of Charles Cadman’s Dark Dancers of the Mardi Gras.

Joel Fan has recorded for Reference Recordings, Sony Classical, Verdant World Records, and Albany Records. The following is a list of his recording credits:

2018 Leon Kirchner: Music for Orchestra             Boston Modern Orchestra Project / Gil Rose           Joel Fan, Liner Notes

2014 Dances for Piano and Orchestra              Christophe Chagnard / Joel Fan / Northwest Sinfonietta

2013 Leon Kirchner: Revelations                    Joel Fan, Diana Hoagland, Beverly Hoch, Leon Kirchner

2012 Traditions And Transformations / Yo-Yo Ma, Wu Man

2011 Something to Sing About                                                 Lisa Kirchner

2009 West of the Sun: Music of the Americas                          Joel Fan

2007 Appassionato                                                                      Yo-Yo Ma

2007 Leon Kirchner - Works For Solo Piano               Leon Fleisher, Max Levinson, Peter Serkin, Jonathan Biss, Joel Fan, Jeremy Denk

2006 30th Anniversary Sampler                                                 Various

2006 World Keys                                                                          Joel Fan

2005 Silk Road Journeys: Beyond the Horizon           Yo-Yo Ma / Silk Road Ensemble

2004 Sounds of Yo-Yo Ma                                                           Yo-Yo Ma

2002 Silk Road Journeys: When Strangers Meet         Yo-Yo Ma / Silk Road Ensemble

2001 Silk Road Journeys                                                             Yo-Yo Ma

Commissions and World Premieres 
"I’ve always had the goal of bringing 10 new piano compositions to life that would help elucidate the state of modern pianism. I started several years ago, with Leon Kirchner’s last piano sonata as the first of this sequence." - Joel Fan 

Leon Kirchner: Piano Sonata No. 3, "The Forbidden"

Leon Kirchner's music has been recognized with a Naumburg Award (for his Piano Concerto No.1) and the Pulitzer Prize (for the String Quartet No.3 with tape,1967) among other citations. Kirchner taught at Harvard from 1961 to 1989, and "among the beneficiaries of his instruction who have gone on to become champions of his music are cellist Yo-Yo Ma and the pianist Joel Fan."

To pianist Joel Fan, an alumnus of Kirchner's courses at Harvard University, his music is of “pure artistic integrity, revealing the highest ideals for which music stands.” In March 2002, Joel Fan entered into a contract with Kirchner, who agreed to compose a solo piano sonata. Leon Kirchner's compact Sonata No. 3, “The Forbidden,” which was written for Mr. Fan in 2006, refers to his use of tonality, “forbidden” at the time. This was his way of linking the past with the present, keeping "the art of music alive and well". Joel Fan premiered "The Forbidden" on November 11, 2006 in Cambridge, MA.

The work had gradually evolved in the composer's mind since 2003, undergoing a process of genesis and refinement over the years until its final completion. It started off as the Piano Sonata No. 3, then was cast as the String Quartet No. 4, and finally orchestrated..., commissioned by James Levine for the Boston Symphony Orchestra (2008), are all titled “The Forbidden.” 

Joel Fan has recorded "The Forbidden" for Albany Records (2007) and Verdant World Records (2013).

“As a pianist, I’ve always been fascinated by the way music is created…  “That’s why I created the Open Source Music Festival – a festival of music aimed at exploration, collaboration, sharing and ultimately, the reimagination of music.” - Joel Fan

Joel Fan, Artistic Director of the Open Source Music Festival, invited four composer couples to write a piece inspired by an existing piece of music. Fan said, “We wanted to explore the tension and interplay of relationships in a collaborative, creative process, and the meaning of reimagination for these acclaimed composers.” Joel Fan performed the World Premiere of each of their works on November 18, 2017 at the Open Source Music Festival in New York, NY.

Augusta Read Thomas & Bernard Rands: Two Thoughts About The Piano

AXIS  by Augusta Read Thomas - IMPROMPTU NO. 3  by Bernard Rands

"Two Thoughts About The Piano was inspired by - and is a response to - Elliott Carter's Caténaires, from his Two Thoughts About the Piano. My work is entirely original and does not quote from or share music in common with Mr. Carter’s work".— Augusta Read Thomas

"Augusta then composed a series of about thirteen chords that serve as a potent seed and source embryo for both her work and Bernard’s work... Each in our own way, we used these chords as the harmonic structure of our respective pieces without any further collaboration... Bernard also analyzed the note succession of the Carter and the order in which each pitch occurs until all twelve have arrived. He then composed his IMPROMPTU #3 using the rich harmonies referred to above in the slow sections and the pitch ordering in the alternating fast sections."

AXIS by Augusta Read Thomas and IMPROMPTU NO. 3 by Bernard Rands have been performed as separate works, and together as a single work. Joel Fan performed the world premiere of Rands IMPROMPTU NO. 3  on radio station WQXR in New York City on November 7, 2017,  and as a part of Bernard Rands' Four Impromptus in Cambridge, MA on April 18, 2019. AXIS - composed by Augusta Read Thomas, was a mandatory piece for the finalists in the Ferruccio Busoni International Piano Competition, September 2019, in Bolzano, Italy.

"Collectively titled 'Two Thoughts About The Piano,  they demonstrate the pianist’s virtuosity, with trills, repeated notes and angular gestures abounding to explore the entire compass of the instrument." Two Thoughts About The Piano received its world premiere by Joel Fan on November 18, 2017 in New York, NY.Evan Ziporyn & Christine Southworth: Don't Want to WaitChristine Southworth is a composer and video artist based in Lexington, Massachusetts, dedicated to creating art born from a cross-pollination of sonic and visual ideas. Composer/conductor/clarinetist Evan Ziporyn's music has taken him from Balinese temples to concert halls around the world.

Christine Southworth and Evan Ziporyn wrote their haunting work Don’t Want to Wait, together, "passing it back and forth like a game of telephone." Their piece is a musical response to the Van Halen tune, Don’t Want to Wait for Tomorrow. Joel Fan performed the world premiere of Don’t Want To Wait on November 18, 2017 in New York, NY. “We loved what he did with our music,” says Ziporyn, who is faculty director at MIT's Center for Arts, Science & Technology.Julia Wolfe & Michael Gordon: Hand in HandJulia Wolfe's music is distinguished by an intense physicality and a relentless power that pushes performers to extremes and demands attention from the audience. She was awarded the 2015 Pulitzer Prize for Music, and was named a MacArthur Fellow in 2016. Michael Gordon has been honored by the Guggenheim Foundation, the National Endowment for the Arts, the Foundation for Contemporary Performance Arts, and the American Academy of Arts and Letters. He is co-founder and co-artistic director of New York's legendary music collective Bang on a Can. Joel Fan performed the world premiere of Hand in Hand on November 18, 2017 in New York, NY.Wang Lu & Anthony Cheung: RecombinantWang Lu is an Assistant Professor of Music at Brown University, where she teaches composition and theory. She is the Spring 2019 Berlin Prize Fellow in composition at the American Academy in Berlin, and was a 2014 Guggenheim Fellow. Anthony Cheung is the recipient of a 2016 Guggenheim Fellowship, and he has also received awards from the American Academy of Arts and Letters (Charles Ives Fellowship and Scholarship) and ASCAP, and first prize in the Sixth International Dutilleux Competition (2008), as well as a Rome Prize from the American Academy in Rome (2012).

Recombinant was composed by the composer couple in two parts - Part 1 by Wang Lu, Part 2 by Anthony Cheung. Joel Fan premiered the composition by Wang Lu on radio station WKCR in New York, NY on October 29, 2017. Fan subsequently performed the world premiere of Recombinant on November 18, 2017.World Premiere RecordingsJoel Fan's world premiere recordings include the following:

Leon Kirchner: Piano Sonata No. 3, "The Forbidden"

Dia Succari: La Nuit du Destin

Halim El Dabh: Sayera from Mekta in the art of Kita

Qigang Chen: Instants d'un opera de Pekin

Peter Sculthorpe: Nocturnal

Peteris Vasks: Kantate

William Bolcom: Nine New Bagatelles

 Notable Quotes 
The following are a selection of Joel Fan quotations about music and performing:On Music Education“Talent never exists by itself. Talent only exists because of opportunity.” 

“It’s an incredibly exciting opportunity for me to work with these students and the MIT faculty composers,”  “They are all exploring the boundaries of piano and of sound, asking what it means to be a pianist in the year 2019.”

"I think music education for young people is a really important role of an artist," …"It's really important to inspire those with talent to make the most of what is given to them."

"I hope it's educational," … "It's a very important part of what I do as an artist, and what I think all artists should do: make people think a little bit."On Repertoire"One of the themes of my career has been putting the traditional with the rare" 

"Hammerklavier" sonata by Beethoven is an amazing creation of moods and emotions," "It's a privilege to play it. It's definitely a journey of Titanic proportions. It illustrates the ultimate limits of what a piano can do."

“No creation or innovation exists in a vacuum. We're all dealing with inspirations from other people and thinkers, whether it's in philosophy or science or music. And one of the big themes right now is the way information is globally shared and the way collaboration can happen instantaneously. We're all connected around the world, wherever we are, even if we don't want to be. Not only the world's information is at your fingertips; the world's music is, too.” 

"As a musician, you really are like an ambassador for cultural exchange," "I hope to have stimulated them both emotionally, and intellectually.”

"Rachmaninoff was a big fan of a unified motif,” ...“where the key elements of the theme come back."“Rachmaninoff was very structured in the way he wrote music.”“It feels very organic and whole -- a unified whole.”

“The inspiration for my last two albums is clearly from Silk Road: How do you take this experience, this exploration and cultural way of looking at music, and put it into a solo piano context? “

"It's not just the sound, it's also the silences,..”.Beethoven's music reflects the struggle of the individual versus the universe…”On Performing“The piano is our link to musical history. It’s something that brought joy to people hundreds of years ago and continues to bring joy today. It’s a masterpiece of engineering, and a celebration of human achievement.”

“In every piece, hundreds or thousands of such relationships can be brought to light to illuminate the beauty of a composition and to unify its conception at performance time… Kirchner was able to explain why such information should not be overlooked, in order to realize the composer’s intentions as beautifully as possible.” 

“This music is art, but it still needs to entertain -- to entertain intellectually, to entertain by playing dazzling stuff and to entertain by challenging the audience and opening ears.”

“When you play music, it’s really an incredible experience to be on stage -- connecting with the audience, bringing music to life. It’s quite magical.”

“And you bring the audience on this journey, this exploration of musical styles, of rhythm and sound on the piano -- and of emotion. That's the bedrock.”On the Open Source Music Festival'''“As a pianist, I’ve always been fascinated by the way music is created - how musical ideas are shared and new musical trends emerge.”“Open Source is the simple idea that we share our creative work, and allow others to build upon it freely. We’ve built our whole music festival around this idea.” 

 Awards and critical acclaim 
In addition to winning the Philharmonic's Young People's Concert Auditions, Fan has been awarded by several international competitions, notably the D’Anglo Young Artists International Competition and Busoni International Piano Competition. He was the winner of the Kosciuzko Foundation's Chopin Prize and named a Presidential Scholar by the National Foundation for Advancement in the Arts.

Joel Fan is a Steinway Artist.Seattle Post-Intelligencer has described him as "a superb musician, able to cross one style into another without any diminution in musical sophistication." The Los Angeles Times says he is a " soaring talent - Fan's facility makes his playing a technical wonder." The Washington Post'' noted him as "a versatile and sensitive pianist – an impressive talent."

References

External links 
 Official site
Twitter
YouTube
Open Source Music Festival
Spotify
Apple Music

1969 births
Living people
Harvard University alumni
American classical pianists
American male classical pianists
American musicians of Taiwanese descent
American people of Taiwanese descent
Hunter College High School alumni
Peabody Institute alumni
20th-century classical pianists
20th-century classical musicians
21st-century classical pianists
20th-century American pianists
21st-century American pianists
20th-century American male musicians
21st-century American male musicians